Eric Daniel Peddle (born March 8, 1970) is an American screenwriter, film director, casting director, author, and artist.

Early life

Peddle was born in Winston-Salem, North Carolina, the son of Betty and Larry Peddle.  He graduated from the University of North Carolina at Chapel Hill with a bachelor's degree in Anthropology and RTVMP (radio television motion picture).  While attending graduate film school at NYU, Peddle worked as a “street scout” finding undiscovered talent for his student films. This means of casting soon evolved into a thriving fashion casting company with an international clientele such as Comme des Garçons, Phillip Lim, and Givenchy.  His discoveries range from Donald Cumming, former lead singer of "The Virgins", to Academy Award winner Jennifer Lawrence, who he discovered near Union Square when she was fourteen-years-old, to rising star and top model Mitchell Slaggert.

Career
Peddle formed The Secret Gallery Inc. with partner Drew Dasent in 2001. The company works with international modeling and talent agencies and cast for worldwide print advertising, magazine editorials, runway shows, TV commercials, independent films and digital media.

It was through street casting that Peddle first encountered the subjects of his debut feature documentary film The Aggressives (2005).  The film was awarded the Kinsey Honor from the Kinsey Institute and numerous “Best of” awards at documentary film festivals worldwide. Peddle's written piece on The Aggressives was published in the subcultural book Transculturalism by Powerhouse books.

Peddle's second documentary, Trail Angels was released in October 2014 and was showcased on the Documentary Channel.

In 2014, Peddle completed his first narrative feature, Sunset Edge.  Sunset Edge had its world premiere at Museum of the Moving Image (New York City). The film was released by Kino International  in 2015.  Part gothic thriller, part coming-of-age tale, Sunset Edge upends teenage horror films.

Garden of the Peaceful Dragon (2016), Peddle's third feature documentary is an intimate and transformative portrait of an elderly African-American veteran who occupies an abandoned piece of government property in Hawaii.  The film premiered at the Harlem International Film Festival Harlem International Film Festival as the opening night feature and won the Best Documentary award.  The film will be released by Quickflix in 2018.

Moss, Peddle's latest narrative feature boasts an entire cast discovered by him, including newcomer Mitchell Slaggert who was signed with WME shortly after filming his debut role as "Moss".  The film explores death and isolation in rural America, the creation of "outsider art", gender roles of traditional folklore and the psychedelic experience as a rite of passage.

Peddle's debut solo painting show “Undertow”, displayed at Envoy Enterprises in 2012, was named “Critic’s pick” by New York Arts Magazine and garnered national praise. Peddle is represented as a fine artist by No Romance Galleries in New York City.
Aside from filmmaking and mixed media painting, Doubleday published Peddle's Snow Day, a wordless children's book in 2000.  Following Snow Day, Peddle's remaining seasonal series include Daisy Diary, Sand Stars, and Pumpkin Peace. Others include When Mr. Grand Flew, Clyde’s Dogs, The Back Talk Trio, Ooooh Baby!, and Close Your Eyes- a bedtime meditation.

Filmography
 The Aggressives (2005)
Trail Angels (2010)
Sunset Edge (2014)
Garden of The Peaceful Dragon (2017)
Moss (2018)

References

External links

American male screenwriters
Writers from Winston-Salem, North Carolina
1970 births
Living people
Film directors from North Carolina
Screenwriters from North Carolina